Leucandra is a genus of calcareous sponge belonging to the family Grantiidae.  Its earliest known fossils are from the Jurassic.

Species

 Leucandra abratsbo Hozawa, 1929
 Leucandra algoaensis (Bowerbank, 1864)
 Leucandra amakusana Tanita, 1943
 Leucandra amorpha Poléjaeff, 1883
 Leucandra ananas (Montagu, 1814)
 Leucandra anfracta (Urban, 1908)
 Leucandra anguinea (Ridley, 1884)
 Leucandra apicalis Urban, 1906
 Leucandra armata (Urban, 1908)
 Leucandra aspera (Schmidt, 1862)
 Leucandra astricta Tanita, 1942
 Leucandra australiensis (Carter, 1886)
 Leucandra balearica Lackschewitz, 1886
 Leucandra barbata (Duchassaing & Michelotti, 1864)
 Leucandra bathybia (Haeckel, 1869)
 Leucandra belemnifera (Tsurnamal, 1975)
 Leucandra bleeki (Haeckel, 1872)
 Leucandra bolivari Ferrer-Hernandez, 1916
 Leucandra brumalis Jenkin, 1908
 Leucandra bulbosa Hanitsch, 1895
 Leucandra caminus Haeckel, 1872
 Leucandra capillata (Poléjaeff, 1883)
 Leucandra caribea Cóndor-Luján, Louzada, Hajdu & Klautau, 2018
 Leucandra cerebrum Hozawa & Tanita, 1941
 Leucandra cirrhosa (Urban, 1908)
 Leucandra claviformis Schuffner, 1877
 Leucandra coimbrae (Breitfuss, 1898)
 Leucandra comata Brøndsted, 1931
 Leucandra compacta (Carter, 1886)
 Leucandra conica Lendenfeld, 1885
 Leucandra connectens Brøndsted, 1927
 Leucandra consolida Tanita, 1943
 Leucandra crambessa Haeckel, 1872
 Leucandra crassior Ridley, 1881
 Leucandra crosslandi Thacker, 1908
 Leucandra crustacea (Haeckel, 1872)
 Leucandra cumberlandensis Lambe, 1900
 Leucandra curva (Schuffner, 1877)
 Leucandra cylindrica Fristedt, 1887
 Leucandra donnani Dendy, 1905
 Leucandra dwarkaensis Dendy, 1916
 Leucandra echinata Schuffner, 1877
 Leucandra egedii (Schmidt, 1870)
 Leucandra elegans (Lendenfeld, 1888)
 Leucandra erinacea Lendenfeld, 1888
 Leucandra falakra Klautau, Imesek, Azevedo, Plese, Nikolic & Cetkovic, 2016
 Leucandra falcigera Schuffner, 1877
 Leucandra fernandensis (Breitfuss, 1898)
 Leucandra fistulosa (Johnston, 1842)
 Leucandra foliata Hozawa, 1918
 Leucandra fragilis Hozawa, 1940
 Leucandra frigida Jenkin, 1908
 Leucandra gausapata Brøndsted, 1931
 Leucandra gaussii (Brøndsted, 1931)
 Leucandra glabra Hozawa, 1940
 Leucandra globosa Tanita, 1943
 Leucandra gossei (Bowerbank, 1862)
 Leucandra haurakii Brøndsted, 1927
 Leucandra heathi Urban, 1906
 Leucandra helena (Lendenfeld, 1885)
 Leucandra henrycarteri Van Soest & Hooper, 2020
 Leucandra hentschelii Brøndsted, 1931
 Leucandra hispida (Carter, 1886)
 Leucandra hozawai Tanita, 1942
 Leucandra impigra Tanita, 1942
 Leucandra intermedia (Haeckel, 1872)
 Leucandra irregularis (Burton, 1930)
 Leucandra kagoshimensis Hozawa, 1929
 Leucandra kerguelensis (Urban, 1908)
 Leucandra kurilensis Hozawa, 1918
 Leucandra laptevi Koltun, 1952
 Leucandra levis (Poléjaeff, 1883)
 Leucandra lobata (Carter, 1886)
 Leucandra loricata (Poléjaeff, 1883)
 Leucandra losangelensis (de Laubenfels, 1930)
 Leucandra magna Tanita, 1942
 Leucandra masatierrae (Breitfuss, 1898)
 Leucandra mawsoni Dendy, 1918
 Leucandra meandrina Lendenfeld, 1885
 Leucandra mediocancellata Hozawa, 1940
 Leucandra minima Row & Hozawa, 1931
 Leucandra minor (Urban, 1908)
 Leucandra mitsukurii Hozawa, 1929
 Leucandra mozambiquensis Van Soest & De Voogd, 2018
 Leucandra multifida (Carter, 1886)
 Leucandra multiformis Polejaeff, 1883
 Leucandra multituba Hozawa, 1929
 Leucandra nakamurai Tanita, 1942
 Leucandra nausicaae (Schuffner, 1877)
 Leucandra nicolae Wörheide & Hooper, 2003
 Leucandra odawarensis Hozawa, 1929
 Leucandra okinoseana Hozawa, 1929
 Leucandra onigaseana Hozawa, 1929
 Leucandra ovata (Poléjaeff, 1883)
 Leucandra pacifica Hozawa, 1929
 Leucandra palaoensis Tanita, 1943
 Leucandra pallida Row & Hozawa, 1931
 Leucandra pandora (Haeckel, 1872)
 Leucandra paucispina Hozawa, 1929
 Leucandra phillipensis Dendy, 1893
 Leucandra pilula Van Soest & De Voogd, 2018
 Leucandra platei (Breitfuss, 1898)
 Leucandra poculiformis Hozawa, 1918
 Leucandra polejaevi (Breitfuss, 1896)
 Leucandra prava (Breitfuss, 1898)
 Leucandra pulvinar (Haeckel, 1870)
 Leucandra pumila (Bowerbank, 1866)
 Leucandra pyriformis (Lambe, 1893)
 Leucandra ramosa (Burton, 1934)
 Leucandra regina Brøndsted, 1927
 Leucandra reniformis Tanita, 1943
 Leucandra rigida Hozawa, 1940
 Leucandra riojai Ferrer-Hernandez, 1918
 Leucandra rodriguezi (Lackschewitz, 1886)
 Leucandra rudifera (Poléjaeff, 1883)
 Leucandra sagmiana Hozawa, 1929
 Leucandra secutor Brøndsted, 1927
 Leucandra serrata Azevedo & Klautau, 2007
 Leucandra seychellensis Hozawa, 1940
 Leucandra sola Tanita, 1942
 Leucandra solida Hozawa, 1929
 Leucandra sphaeracella Wörheide & Hooper, 2003
 Leucandra spinifera Klautau, Imesek, Azevedo, Plese, Nikolic & Cetkovic, 2016
 Leucandra spinosa Hozawa, 1940
 Leucandra spissa (Urban, 1909)
 Leucandra splendens Hozawa, 1918
 Leucandra sulcata Ferrer-Hernandez, 1918
 Leucandra tahuatae Klautau, Lopes, Guarabyra, Folcher, Ekins & Debitus, 2020
 Leucandra taylori Lambe, 1900
 Leucandra thulakomorpha Row & Hozawa, 1931
 Leucandra tomentosa Tanita, 1940
 Leucandra topsenti Breitfuss, 1929
 Leucandra tropica Tanita, 1943
 Leucandra tuba Hozawa, 1918
 Leucandra tuberculata Hozawa, 1929
 Leucandra typica (Poléjaeff, 1883)
 Leucandra uschuariensis Tanita, 1942
 Leucandra vaginata Lendenfeld, 1885
 Leucandra valida Lambe, 1900
 Leucandra verdensis Thacker, 1908
 Leucandra vermiformis Tanita, 1941
 Leucandra vesicularis Brøndsted, 1927
 Leucandra villosa Lendenfeld, 1885
 Leucandra vitrea (Urban, 1908)
 Leucandra yuriagensis Hozawa, 1933

References

Leucosolenida
Sponge genera
Taxa named by Ernst Haeckel